Giulio Campanati (12 June 1923 – 30 October 2011) is an Italian former football referee.

He served as referee 166 times in Serie A between 1952 and 1966. He also refereed the 1964 Coppa Italia Final.

He served as an international referee for both UEFA and FIFA for a decade. He also refeed the second leg of the 1962 Inter-Cities Fairs Cup Final.

In 1960, Campanati was awarded the Giovanni Mauro Award as the best referee of the season.

In 1966, he became a referee administrator. He was President of the Italian Referees Association from 1972 to 1990.

In 2013, he was posthumously inducted into the Italian Football Hall of Fame.

Honours
UEFA Order of Merit in Ruby: 2000
Italian Football Hall of Fame: 2011

References

External links
 

1923 births
2011 deaths
Italian football referees